The National Association of Re-enactment Societies (NAReS) was formed in 1991 and is a UK organisation that brings together UK historical re-enactment groups.

Objectives

Its aim is to take the lead in safety standards and professionalism within historical re-enactment.

Activities

It acts as a liaison and negotiating body between UK government, other legislative bodies and the police. Guidance on a wide range of topics (e.g. Health & Safety, Firearms) is issued and conferences and training events are held for re-enactment societies throughout the United Kingdom.

Current Member Groups & Societies for 2020

•	Crown and Empire

•	Linstock & Pledget

•	Re-enacting Ancient Times Society

•	East Yorkshire Regiment Living History Association

•	2nd Guards Rifle Division

•	Northern Rough Riders

•	Regia Anglorum

•	The Sealed Knot

•	Trailblazers

•	The Vikings

•	World War 2 Living History Association

•	43rd Reconnaissance Regiment LHG

•	The Manchester Regiment 1914 – 1918

•	The Medieval Siege Society

•	Rolling Thunder

•	The Ragged Victorians – The Great Unwashed

•	The Southern Skirmish Association

•	The Wyomings - Authentic Western Society

•	The American Civil War Society

•	The Mid-Victorian Militia

•	The Cheshire Home Guard

This list will be updated as new Groups & Societies become member organisation of NAReS

This page is also monitored regularly.

Richard Simmons
NAReS
Chairman

External links
The National Association of Re-enactment Societies (NAReS)

Historical reenactment groups